Norm Andrews (7 April 1914 – 16 August 1977) was an  Australian rules footballer who played with Fitzroy in the Victorian Football League (VFL).

Notes

External links 
		

1914 births
1977 deaths
Australian rules footballers from Victoria (Australia)
Fitzroy Football Club players